Jane M. Maidment is a New Zealand social work academic, and as of 2019 is a full professor at the University of Canterbury.

Academic career
After a PhD titled  'Social work field education in New Zealand'  at the University of Canterbury, Maidment joined the staff, rising to full professor.

Much of Maidments' research involves social work teaching.

Selected works 
 Maidment, Jane. "Problems experienced by students on field placement: Using research findings to inform curriculum design and content." Australian Social Work 56, no. 1 (2003): 50–60.
 Maidment, Jane, and Ronnie Egan. Practice skills in social work and welfare: More than just common sense. No. 2nd ed. Allen and Unwin, 2009.
 Connolly, Marie, Louise Harms, and Jane Maidment, eds. Social work: Contexts and practice. Oxford University Press Australia & New Zealand, 2009.
 Maidment, Jane. "The quiet remedy: A dialogue on reshaping professional relationships." Families in Society 87, no. 1 (2006): 115–121.
 Maidment, Jane. "Teaching social work online: Dilemmas and debates." Social Work Education 24, no. 2 (2005): 185–195.
 Maidment, Jane. "Using on-line delivery to support students during practicum placements." Australian social work 59, no. 1 (2006): 47–55.

References

Living people
New Zealand women academics
Year of birth missing (living people)
Academic staff of the University of Canterbury
University of Canterbury alumni
New Zealand social workers
Social work scholars
New Zealand educational theorists
New Zealand women writers